The Aleutian Arc is a large volcanic arc in the U.S. state of Alaska. It consists of a number of active and dormant volcanoes that have formed as a result of subduction along the Aleutian Trench. Although taking its name from the Aleutian Islands, this term is a geologic grouping rather than a geographic one, and the Aleutian Arc extends through the Alaska Peninsula following the Aleutian Range to the Aleutian Islands.

The Aleutian Arc reflects subduction of the Pacific Plate beneath the North American Plate. It extends  from the Kamchatka Peninsula in the west to the Gulf of Alaska in the east. Unimak Pass at the southwestern end of the Alaska Peninsula marks the eastward transition from an intra-oceanic in the west to a continental arc in the east. Due to the arcuate geometry of the trench, the relative velocity vector changes from almost trench-normal in the Gulf of Alaska to almost trench-parallel in the west.

Volcanoes
Volcanoes within this arc include:

Mount Adagdak
Mount Akutan
Mount Amak
Mount Amukta
Mount Aniakchak
Augustine Volcano
Black Peak
Bogoslof Island
Mount Carlisle
Mount Chiginagak
Cleveland Volcano
Cold Bay Volcano
Mount Dana
Davidof Volcano
Mount Denison
Devils Desk
Mount Douglas
Mount Dutton
Mount Emmons
Fourpeaked Mountain
Mount Frosty
Gareloi Volcano
Great Sitkin
Mount Gilbert
Mount Griggs
Hayes Volcano
Mount Iliamna
Isanotski Peaks
Mount Kaguyak
Mount Kanaga
Kasatochi Island
Mount Katmai
Mount Kialagvik
Kiska
Korovin Volcano
Mount Kukak
Mount Kupreanof
Mount Mageik
Makushin Volcano
Mount Martin
Novarupta
Nunivak Island
Mount Okmok
Mount Pavlof
Pavlof Sister
Pogromni Volcano
Mount Recheshnoi
Mount Redoubt
Saint Paul Island
Mount Seguam
Segula Island
Semisopochnoi Island
Mount Shishaldin
Snowy Mountain
Mount Spurr
Mount Steller
Tanaga
Trident Volcano
Ugashik-Peulik
Mount Veniaminof
Mount Vsevidof
Mount Westdahl
Yantarni Volcano

References

External links
Geoprisms.org: Aleutian Arc

Aleutian Islands
Aleutian Range
Volcanic arcs
Volcanism of Alaska